New Romney was a parliamentary constituency in Kent, which elected two Members of Parliament (MPs) to the House of Commons from 1371 until 1832, when it was abolished by the Great Reform Act.

New Romney was a Cinque Port, which made it technically of different status from a parliamentary borough, but the difference was purely a nominal one. The constituency consisted of the town of New Romney; it had once been a flourishing port but by the 19th century the harbour had been destroyed and there was no maritime trade, the main economic activity being grazing cattle on Romney Marsh. In 1831, the population of the constituency was 978, and the town contained 165 houses.

The right to vote was reserved to the Mayor and Common Council of the town; however, many of these were customs or excise officers, who were disqualified from voting by a change in the law in 1782, so that in the early 19th century there were only 8 voters. The high proportion of voters holding paid government posts before this change in the law meant that New Romney was sometimes considered to be a "treasury borough" (that is, a constituency whose seats were in the gift of the government); but in practice the Dering family, local landowners, were even more influential and could sometimes defy government pressure.

The Dering influence in New Romney seems mainly to have been achieved by letting out property to voters and their relatives at easy rents and without leases. In 1761, for example, the despairing Whig MP, Rose Fuller, explained to Prime Minister Newcastle that he had no chance of re-election since Dering had turned against him, because "several of the governing men are graziers and the Deering and Furnese family have together a very great estate in the neighbouring marsh which is very profitable to and easy for tenants". The reduction in the number of voters naturally made this influence easier, or at least cheaper, to exert.

New Romney was abolished as a constituency by the Reform Act, the town being incorporated into the new Eastern Kent county division.

Members of Parliament

1371-1640

1640-1832

Notes

References 
 Robert Beatson, "A Chronological Register of Both Houses of Parliament" (London: Longman, Hurst, Res & Orme, 1807) 
 D Brunton & D H Pennington, Members of the Long Parliament (London: George Allen & Unwin, 1954)
 Cobbett's Parliamentary history of England, from the Norman Conquest in 1066 to the year 1803 (London: Thomas Hansard, 1808) 
 J. E. Neale, The Elizabethan House of Commons (London: Jonathan Cape, 1949)
 T. H. B. Oldfield, The Representative History of Great Britain and Ireland (London: Baldwin, Cradock & Joy, 1816)
 J Holladay Philbin, Parliamentary Representation 1832 - England and Wales (New Haven: Yale University Press, 1965)
Henry Stooks Smith, The Parliaments of England from 1715 to 1847 (2nd edition, edited by FWS Craig - Chichester: Parliamentary Reference Publications, 1973)
 Frederic A Youngs, jr, "Guide to the Local Administrative Units of England, Vol I" (London: Royal Historical Society, 1979)

Parliamentary constituencies in Kent (historic)
Constituencies of the Parliament of the United Kingdom established in 1371
Constituencies of the Parliament of the United Kingdom disestablished in 1832
Rotten boroughs
Cinque ports parliament constituencies